July is the seventh month of the year in the Julian and Gregorian calendars and is the fourth of seven months to have a length of 31 days. It was named by the Roman Senate in honour of Roman general Julius Caesar in 44 B.C., it being the month of his birth. Before then it was called Quintilis, being the fifth month of the calendar that started with March.

It is on average the warmest month in most of the Northern Hemisphere, where it is the second month of summer, and the coldest month in much of the Southern Hemisphere, where it is the second month of winter. The second half of the year commences in July. In the Southern Hemisphere, July is the seasonal equivalent of January in the Northern hemisphere.

"Dog days" are considered to begin in early July in the Northern Hemisphere, when the hot sultry weather of summer usually starts. Spring lambs born in late winter or early spring are usually sold before 1 July.

July symbols 
 July's birthstone is the ruby, which symbolizes contentment.
  Its birth flowers are the Larkspur or the Water Lily.
 The zodiac signs for the month of July are Cancer (until July 22) and Leo (July 23 onwards).

Observances 
This list does not necessarily imply either official status nor general observance.

 Season of Emancipation 14 April to 23 August (Barbados)
 Honor America Days: 14 June to 4 July (United States)

Month-long observances 
 In Catholic tradition, July is the Month of the Most Precious Blood of Jesus.
 National Hot Dog Month (United States)
 National Ice Cream Month (United States)
 Disability Pride Month (international)

Non-Gregorian observances 
(All Baha'i, Islamic, and Jewish observances begin at the sundown before the date listed, and end at sundown of the date in question unless otherwise noted.)
 List of observances set by the Bahá'í calendar
 List of observances set by the Chinese calendar
 List of observances set by the Hebrew calendar
 List of observances set by the Islamic calendar
 List of observances set by the Solar Hijri calendar

Movable observances 
 Phi Ta Khon (Dan Sai, Loei province, Isan, Thailand) – Dates are selected by village mediums and can take place anywhere between March and July.
 Ra o te Ui Ariki (Cook Islands) July 6
 Collector Car Appreciation Day (United States)
 Senior Citizen's Day (Kiribati)
 Shark Week (United States)
 Earth Overshoot Day
 See also Movable Western Christian observances
 See also Movable Eastern Christian observances

First Friday 
 Fishermen's Holiday (Marshall Islands)

First Saturday 
 American Independence Day
 Día del Amigo (Peru)
 International Co-operative Day
 International Free Hugs Day

First Saturday and Sunday 
 Navy Days (Netherlands)

First Sunday 
 Navy Day (Ukraine)
 Youth Day (Singapore)

Sunday closest to 2 July 
 Alexanderson Day (Sweden)

First full week in July 
 NAIDOC Week (Australia)

First Monday 
 CARICOM Day (Guyana)
 Heroes' Day (Zambia)
 Mother's Day (South Sudan)
 National Day (Cayman Islands)

5 July or following Monday if it's a weekend 
 Tynwald Day (Isle of Man)

Day after first Monday 
 Unity Day (Zambia)

Second Thursday 
 National Tree Day (Mexico)

Second Sunday 
 Father's Day (Uruguay)
 Sea Sunday (Western Christianity)

Nearest Sunday to 11 July 
 National Day of Commemoration (Ireland)

Third Monday 
 Birthday of Don Luis Muñoz Rivera (Puerto Rico, United States)
 Children's Day (Cuba, Panama, and Venezuela)
 Galla Bayramy (Turkmenistan)
 Marine Day (Japan)
 Presidents' Day (Botswana)

Third Sunday 
 Galla Bayramy (Turkmenistan)
 National Ice Cream Day (United States)

Second to last Sunday in July and the following two weeks 
 Construction Holiday (Quebec)

Third Tuesday 
 Birthday of Don Luis Muñoz Rivera (Puerto Rico, United States)

Fourth Sunday 
 Parents' Day (United States)

Friday preceding the Fourth Saturday and the following Sunday 
 Tobata Gion Yamagasa festival (Tobata, Japan)

Fourth Thursday 
 National Chili Dog Day (United States)

Last Saturday 
 Black Saturday (France)
 National Dance Day (United States)

Last Sunday 
 Father's Day (Dominican Republic)
 National Tree Day (Australia)
 Navy Day (Russia)
 Reek Sunday (Ireland)

Thursday before the first Monday 
 Emancipation Day (Bermuda)

Following Friday 
 Somer's Day (Bermuda)

Last Friday 
 National Schools Tree Day (Australia)
 System Administrator Appreciation Day

Fixed Gregorian observances 
 July 1
 Armed Forces Day (Singapore)
 Canada Day (Canada)
 Children's Day (Pakistan)
 Chinese Communist Party Founding Day (People's Republic of China)
 Day of Officials and Civil Servants (Hungary)
 Doctors' Day (India)
 Emancipation Day (Netherlands Antilles)
 Engineer's Day (Bahrain, Mexico)
 Feast of the Most Precious Blood (removed from official Roman Catholic calendar since 1969)
 Hong Kong Special Administrative Region Establishment Day (Hong Kong, China)
 Independence Day (Burundi)
 Independence Day (Rwanda)
 Independence Day (Somalia)
 International Tartan Day
 July Morning (Bulgaria)
 Keti Koti (Emancipation Day) (Suriname)
 Madeira Day (Madeira, Portugal)
 Moving Day (Quebec) (Canada)
 National Creative Ice Cream Flavor Day (United States)
 National Gingersnap Day (United States)
 Newfoundland and Labrador Memorial Day
 Republic Day (Ghana)
 Sir Seretse Khama Day (Botswana)
 Territory Day (British Virgin Islands)
 Van Mahotsav, celebrated until July 7 (India)
 July 2
 Flag Day (Curaçao) (Kingdom of the Netherlands)
 Palio di Provenzano (Siena, Italy)
 Police Day (Azerbaijan)
 World UFO Day
 July 3
 The start of the dog days according to the Old Farmer's Almanac but not according to established meaning in most European cultures.
 Emancipation Day (United States Virgin Islands)
 Independence Day (Belarus)
 Stay out of the Sun Day
 July 4
 Birthday of Queen Sonja (Norway)
 Dree Festival, celebrated until July 7 (Apatani people, Arunachal Pradesh, India)
 Independence Day (Abkhazia)
 Independence Day (United States)
 Liberation Day (Northern Mariana Islands)
 Liberation Day (Rwanda)
 Republic Day (Philippines)
 July 5
 Armed Forces Day (Venezuela)
 Bloody Thursday (International Longshore and Warehouse Union)
 Constitution Day (Armenia)
 Emancipation Day (New York City, United States)
 Independence Day (Algeria)
 Independence Day (Cape Verde)
 Independence Day (Venezuela)
 Saints Cyril and Methodius Feast Day (celebrated as a public holiday in Slovakia)
 X-Day (Church of the SubGenius)
 July 6
 Constitution Day (Cayman Islands)
 Day of the Capital (Kazakhstan)
 National Fried Chicken Day (United States)
 Independence Day (Comoros)
 Independence Day/Republic Day, (Malawi)
 Jan Hus Day (Czech Republic)
 Kupala Night (Poland, Russia, Belarus and Ukraine)
 Statehood Day (Lithuania)
 Teachers' Day (Peru)
 July 7
 Independence Day (Solomon Islands)
 Ivan Kupala Day (Belarus, Russia, Ukraine)
 Saba Saba Day (Tanzania)
 Tanabata (Japan, Gregorian date, some follow the traditional calendar)
 World Chocolate Day
 July 8
 Air Force and Air Defense Forces Day (Ukraine)
 Peter and Fevronia Day (Russian Orthodox)
 July 9
 Arbor Day (Cambodia)
 Constitution Day (Australia)
 Constitution Day (Palau)
 Constitutionalist Revolution Day (São Paulo)
 Day of the Employees of the Diplomatic Service (Azerbaijan)
 Independence Day (Argentina, South Sudan)
 Nunavut Day (Nunavut)
 July 10
 Armed Forces Day (Mauritania)
 Beatles Day (Liverpool and Hamburg)
 Independence Day (Bahamas)
 Nikola Tesla Day
 Statehood Day (Wyoming)
 July 11
 China National Maritime Day (China)
 Day of the Flemish Community (Flemish Community of Belgium)
 Eleventh Night (Northern Ireland)
 Gospel Day (Kiribati)
 Imamat Day (Isma'ilism)
 World Population Day (International)
 July 12
 Birthday of the Heir to the Crown of Tonga (Tonga)
 Independence Day (Kiribati, São Tomé and Príncipe)
 Malala Day
 The Twelfth, also known as Orangemen's Day (Northern Ireland, Newfoundland and Labrador)
 July 13
 Statehood Day (Montenegro)
 July 14
 Bastille Day (France and French dependencies)
 Birthday of Victoria, Crown Princess of Sweden, an official flag flying day (Sweden)
 Hondurans' Day (Honduras)
 Republic Day (Iraq)
 July 15
 Bon Festival (Kantō region, Japan)
 Elderly Men Day (Kiribati)
 Festival of Santa Rosalia (Palermo, Sicily)
 Sultan's Birthday (Brunei Darussalam)
 July 16
 Engineer's Day (Honduras)
 Holocaust Memorial Day (France)
 July 17
 International Firgun Day
 Constitution Day (Finland)
 July 18
 Constitution Day (Uruguay)
 Nelson Mandela International Day
 July 19
 Liberation Day (Nicaragua)
 Martyrs' Day (Burma)
 July 20
 Día del Amigo (Argentina)
 Engineer's Day (Costa Rica)
 Independence Day (Colombia)
 Lempira's Day (Honduras)
 Tree Planting Day (Central African Republic)
 July 21
 Belgian National Day
 Racial Harmony Day (Singapore)
 July 22
 Foundation Day in Cleveland
 July 23
 Birthday of Haile Selassie (Rastafari)
 Children's Day (Indonesia)
 Flag Day (Abkhazia)
 National Hot Dog Day (United States)
 National Remembrance Day (Papua New Guinea)
 Renaissance Day (Oman)
 Revolution Day (Egypt)
 July 24
 Children's Day (Vanuatu)
 Navy Day (Venezuela)
 Pioneer Day (Utah) (United States)
 Simón Bolívar Day (Ecuador, Venezuela, Colombia, and Bolivia)
 July 25
 Guanacaste Day (Costa Rica)
 National Day of Galicia (Galicia (Spain))
 National Baha'i Day (Jamaica)
 Puerto Rico Constitution Day (Puerto Rico)
 Republic Day (Tunisia)
 Revolution Day (Egypt)
 July 26
 Day of National Significance (Barbados)
 Day of the National Rebellion (Cuba)
 Independence Day (Liberia)
 Independence Day (Maldives)
 Kargil Victory Day (India)
 July 27
 Day of Victory in the Great Fatherland Liberation War (North Korea)
 Iglesia ni Cristo Day (the Philippines)
 José Celso Barbosa Day (Puerto Rico)
 Martyrs and Wounded Soldiers Day (Vietnam)
 National Korean War Veterans Armistice Day (United States)
 National Sleepy Head Day (Finland)
 July 28
 Day of Commemoration of the Great Upheaval (Canada)
 Fiestas Patrias (Peru)
 Liberation Day (San Marino)
 Ólavsøka Eve (Faroe Islands)
 World Hepatitis Day
 July 29
 International Tiger Day
 National Anthem Day (Romania)
 National Thai Language Day (Thailand)
 Ólavsøka, opening of the Løgting session (Faroe Islands)
 Olsok (Faroe Islands, (Finland, Norway)
 July 30
 Feast of the Throne (Morocco)
 Día del Amigo (Paraguay)
 Independence Day (Vanuatu)
 Martyrs Day (South Sudan)
 July 31
 Saint Ignatius of Loyola
 Ka Hae Hawaiʻi Day (Hawaii, United States)
 Martyrdom Day of Shahid Udham Singh (Haryana and Punjab, India)
 Treasury Day (Poland)
 Warriors' Day (Malaysia)

See also 
 List of historical anniversaries

References

External links 

 
07